Ferrières-Saint-Hilaire is a commune in the Eure department in the Normandy region in northern France.

Population

Personalities
 Henry de Ferrers's family came from here before he joined William the conqueror to invade England. Henry was given over 200 manors. including most of what is now Derbyshire. The Ferrers brought with them to England their Norman underlords, who were the lords of smaller fiefs falling within their barony. Among these were the Curzon (of Notre-Dame-de-Courson), Livet and Baskerville families.

See also
Communes of the Eure department
Henry de Ferrers

References

Communes of Eure